The Indigo-banded kingfisher (Ceyx cyanopectus) is a species of bird in the family Alcedinidae. It is endemic to the Philippines, where it is generally uncommon but locally widespread in the northern and central islands.

Taxonomy
There are two subspecies, the nominate race: C. c. cyanopectus, which occurs on Luzon, Polillo, Mindoro, Sibuyan and Ticao, and C. c. nigriostris, which is found on Panay, Negros and Cebu, though possibly extinct on Cebu. It forms a superspecies with the southern silvery kingfisher of the southern Philippines.

Diet
The indigo-banded kingfisher feeds on fish and aquatic insects. It perches on rocks and overhanging branches and foliage and dives steeply into the water to catch its prey. Once caught, it returns the prey to the perch where it is beaten and swallowed. Little is known about its breeding behaviour, although it is known to nest in tunnels dug into the banks of streams and rivers.

Its natural habitats are subtropical or tropical dry forests and subtropical or tropical mangrove forests.

References

indigo-banded kingfisher
Endemic birds of the Philippines
Birds of Luzon
Birds of Mindoro
Fauna of Romblon
Fauna of Masbate
Birds of Cebu
Birds of Negros Island
Birds of Panay
indigo-banded kingfisher
indigo-banded kingfisher
Taxonomy articles created by Polbot